Marc Hornschuh (born 2 March 1991) is a German professional footballer who plays as a centre back for FC Zürich.

Career
On 23 March 2015, Borussia Dortmund II captain Hornschuh agreed to join second-tier FSV Frankfurt on a free transfer at the end of the season, after 15 years with Borussia Dortmund, signing a two-year contract until 30 June 2017.

On 31 August 2015, Hornschuh signed a one-year contract with FC St. Pauli. In March 2016 he chose to extend his contract until 2020. In his time with the club, he struggled with injuries.

References

External links
 
 

1991 births
Living people
Footballers from Dortmund
Association football defenders
Association football midfielders
German footballers
Germany youth international footballers
Germany under-21 international footballers
Borussia Dortmund II players
Borussia Dortmund players
FC Ingolstadt 04 players
FC Ingolstadt 04 II players
FC St. Pauli players
Hamburger SV II players
FC Zürich players
2. Bundesliga players
3. Liga players
Regionalliga players
German expatriate footballers
German expatriate sportspeople in Switzerland
Expatriate footballers in Switzerland